Pyura is a large genus of sessile ascidians that live in coastal waters at depths of up to 80 m (260 feet). Like all ascidians, Pyura are filter feeders. A few species, including Pyura chilensis are commercially fished.

Species
Species in this genus include

 Pyura abradata (Kott, 1985)
 Pyura ambonensis (Millar, 1975)
 Pyura antillarum (Van Name, 1921)
 Pyura arenosa (Herdman, 1882)
 Pyura aripuensis (Herdman, 1906)
 Pyura australis (Quoy & Gaimard, 1834)
 Pyura baliensis (Millar, 1975)
 Pyura bouvetensis (Michaelsen, 1904)
 Pyura breviramosa (Sluiter, 1904)
 Pyura cadamostoi (Monniot, 1994)
 Pyura camranica (Vorontsova & Cole, 1995)
 Pyura cancellata (Brewin, 1946)
 Pyura capensis (Hartmeyer)
 Pyura carnea (Brewin, 1948)
 Pyura chilensis (Molina, 1782)
 Pyura columna (Monniot & Monniot, 1991)
 Pyura comma (Hartmeyer, 1906)
 Pyura confragosa (Kott, 1985)
 Pyura crassacapitata (Kott, 1985)
 Pyura crinita (Michaelsen, 1922)
 Pyura curvigona (Tokioka, 1950)
 Pyura dalbyi (Rius & Teske, 2011) 'yellow cunjevoi'
 Pyura discoveryi (Herdman, 1910)
 Pyura discrepans (Sluiter, 1898)
 Pyura doppelgangera (Rius & Teske, 2013) 'doppelganger cunjevoi' 
 Pyura duplicata (Van Name, 1918)
 Pyura dura (Heller, 1877)
 Pyura elongata (Tokioka, 1952)
 Pyura erythrostoma (Quoy and Gaimard, 1834)
 Pyura fissa (Herdman, 1881)
 Pyura gangelion (Savigny, 1816)
 Pyura georgiana (Michaelsen, 1898)
 Pyura gibbosa (Heller, 1878)
 Pyura haustor (Stimpson, 1864)
 Pyura hebridensis (Monniot & Monniot, 2003)
 Pyura herdmani (Drasche, 1884) 'Herdman's red bait'
 Pyura honu (Monniot & Monniot, 1987)
 Pyura hupferi (Michaelsen, 1908)
 Pyura inopinata (Monniot, 1978)
 Pyura irregularis (Herdman, 1881)
 Pyura isobella (Kott, 1985)
 Pyura lanka (Herdman, 1906)
 Pyura legumen (Lesson, 1830)
 Pyura lepidoderma (Tokioka, 1949)
 Pyura lignosa (Michaelsen, 1908)
 Pyura littoralis (Kott, 1956)
 Pyura lutea (Sluiter, 1900)
 Pyura lycoperdon (Monniot & Monniot, 1983)
 Pyura mariscata (Rodrigues, 1966)
 Pyura microcosmus (Savigny, 1816)
 Pyura mirabilis (Drasche, 1884)
 Pyura molguloides (Herdman, 1899)
 Pyura mozambica (Monniot, 2002)
 Pyura multiruga (Monniot & Monniot, 1982)
 Pyura munita (Van Name, 1902)
 Pyura navicula (Kott, 1985)
 Pyura obesa (Hartmeyer, 1919)
 Pyura ostreophila (Hartmeyer & Michaelsen, 1928)
 Pyura pachydermatina (Herdman, 1881) 'sea tulip'
 Pyura paessleri (Michaelsen, 1900)
 Pyura pantex (Savigny, 1816)
 Pyura pennata (Monniot & Monniot, 1991)
 Pyura picta (Brewin, 1950)
 Pyura pilosa Monniot & Monniot, 1974)
 Pyura polycarpa (Sluiter, 1904)
 Pyura praeputialis (Heller, 1878) 'cunjevoi'
 Pyura praia (Monniot & Monniot, 1967)
 Pyura pulla (Sluiter, 1900)
 Pyura rapaformis (Kott, 1990)
 Pyura robusta (Hartmeyer, 1922)
 Pyura rugata (Brewin, 1948)
 Pyura sacciformis (Drasche, 1884)
 Pyura sansibarica (Michaelsen, 1908)
 Pyura scortea (Kott, 1985)
 Pyura setosa (Sluiter, 1905)
 Pyura shiinoi (Tokioka, 1949)
 Pyura spinifera (Quoy & Gaimard, 1834) 'sea tulip'
 Pyura spinosa (Quoy & Gaimard, 1834)
 Pyura spinosissima (Michaelsen, 1922)
 Pyura squamata (Hartmeyer, 1911)
 Pyura squamulosa (Alder, 1863)
 Pyura stolonifera (Heller, 1878) 'red bait' 
 Pyura stubenrauchi (Michaelsen, 1900)
 Pyura styeliformis (Monniot & Monniot, 2001)
 Pyura subuculata (Sluiter, 1900)
 Pyura suteri (Michaelsen, 1908)
 Pyura tasmanensis (Kott, 1985)
 Pyura tessellata (Forbes, 1848)
 Pyura torpida (Sluiter, 1898)
 Pyura trigamica (Tokioka, 1953)
 Pyura trita (Sluiter, 1900)
 Pyura tunica (Kott, 1969)
 Pyura turqueti (Sluiter, 1905)
 Pyura typica (author unknown)
 Pyura uatio (Monniot, 1991)
 Pyura vannamei (Monniot, 1994)
 Pyura viarecta (Kott, 1985)
 Pyura vittata (Stimpson, 1852)

References

External links

 Wildlife of Sydney - Sea Tulip

Stolidobranchia
Tunicate genera